Lynch Mob is the second album by American hard rock band Lynch Mob, and the first album to feature vocalist Robert Mason following the departure of Oni Logan. Logan was fired shortly after touring in support of the band's first album due to his life style that negatively impacted his ability to perform. There were also rumors that he had quit the band while touring in support of Queensrÿche, because he felt intimidated opening up for singer Geoff Tate. In a 1992 interview with Headbangers Ball, Lynch talked highly of Mason and stating, "Mason tracked us down, saying he had to be the singer for the band. He knew he was right for the group. He flew himself out. He was very much the opposite of the last singer. He's very dedicated, has a lot of confidence in his abilities and can definitely take control of an audience".

Due to the rise of the grunge movement and changing musical trends, the album resulted in poorer sales figures than the previous album. However, it has received some positive critical reviews. The album also includes a cover of "Tie Your Mother Down", a song originally released by the British rock band Queen in 1976.

Track listing

Personnel
 Robert Mason – vocals
 George Lynch – guitar
 Anthony Esposito – bass guitar
 Mick Brown – drums

Additional personnel
 Jerry Hey, Larry Williams – horns
 Richard Baker – keyboards
 Glenn Hughes – background vocals

References

Lynch Mob (band) albums
1992 albums
Albums produced by Keith Olsen
Elektra Records albums